Coins of the Maltese lira have been struck from when Malta adopted decimal currency in 1972, to 2007, after which Malta adopted the euro. There were 10 mils in one cent, and 100 cents in one Maltese lira.

First series (1972–1982)
The coins in this series replaced the pre-decimal Pound Sterling which had been in use in Malta since 1825. Therefore, the sizes for some coins were similar to their pre-decimal equivalents, for example the 5c was similar to the shilling and the 10c to the two shillings. These coins were designed by Christopher Ironside OBE.

In June 1975 an octagonal 25 cent coin was introduced to commemorate Malta becoming a republic within the Commonwealth of Nations on 13 December 1974. The new emblem appeared on the obverse side, and the 25c coin was the first coin to depict the new republican emblem.

Second series (1986–2007)
A new series was issued on 19 May 1986, which consisted of 1, 2, 5, 10, 25, 50 cents and 1 lira, all depicting local flora and fauna on the obverse and the republican emblem on the reverse. The 1 lira coin was introduced in this series, replacing a former banknote. In 1988 a new coat of arms was adopted showing a heraldic representation of the Maltese flag, a mural crown and a wreath of olive and palm trees. The coin series of 1991 depicted the new coat of arms, but the reverse side remained the same.

This series remained in use until 2007, being withdrawn in January 2008 upon the introduction of the Euro. They were demonetised in 2010.

References

Coins of Malta
Currencies of Malta
Maltese lira